SB-Pro is a floorball club from Nurmijärvi, Finland. The women's first team plays in the Naisten Salibandyliiga (Women's Floorball League) and the men's first team in the V-Division. There are 532 members in the club (2012 stats) and 21 teams in the Finnish Floorball Federation. SB-Pro has won the Women's Championship of Finland in 2014, 2018 and 2019.

References

External links
SB-Pro Official Website

Finnish floorball teams
Sport of Nurmijärvi
1996 establishments in Finland